Vyuham may refer to:

Vyuham (film)
Vyuham (military), a science of military formations